Pseudautomeris is a genus of moths in the family Saturniidae first described by Claude Lemaire in 1967.

Species
The genus includes the following species:

Pseudautomeris antioquia (Schaus, 1921)
Pseudautomeris arminicuscoensis Brechlin & Meister, 2010
Pseudautomeris arminiyungasensis Brechlin & Meister, 2010
Pseudautomeris boettgeri Naumann, Brosch & Wenczel, 2005
Pseudautomeris brasiliensis (Walker, 1855)
Pseudautomeris chinchipensis Racheli & Racheli, 2006
Pseudautomeris chrisbrechlinae Brechlin & Meister, 2010
Pseudautomeris coronis (Schaus, 1913)
Pseudautomeris erubescens (Boisduval, 1875)
Pseudautomeris fimbridentata (Dognin, 1916)
Pseudautomeris grammivora (E. D. Jones, 1908)
Pseudautomeris hubneri (Boisduval, 1875)
Pseudautomeris irene (Cramer, 1779)
Pseudautomeris lata (Conte, 1906)
Pseudautomeris luteata (Walker, 1865)
Pseudautomeris ophthalmica (Moore, 1883)
Pseudautomeris pohli Lemaire, 1967
Pseudautomeris porifera (Strand, 1920)
Pseudautomeris rudloffi Brechlin & Meister, 2010
Pseudautomeris salmonea (Cramer, 1777)
Pseudautomeris stawiarskii (Gagarin, 1936)
Pseudautomeris subcoronis Lemaire, 1967
Pseudautomeris toulgoeti Lemaire, 2002
Pseudautomeris yourii Lemaire, 1985

References

Hemileucinae